Basot is a village in Bhikiasain, Uttarakhand, Uttarakhand, India.

References

Villages in Jaunpur district